Townhill is an electoral ward of Swansea, Wales, UK.  It is named after the Townhill area of Swansea.

The electoral ward consists of some or all of the following geographical areas: Cwm-Gwyn, Mayhill, and Townhill in the parliamentary constituency of Swansea West.  The ward is bounded by the wards of Cockett and Cwmbwrla to the north; Castle to the east; and the Uplands to the south.

For electoral purposes the local council divides Townhill into a number of polling districts, which are: Pryderi, Dyfed Avenue, Gwynedd Avenue, Gors Avenue, Mayhill North and Mayhill South.  The ward returns three councillors who are Geoffrey Burtonshaw, David Hopkins and Billy Jones, all of whom represent the Labour Party.

2008 local council elections
For the 2008 local council elections, the turnout for Townhill was 26.9%.  The election results were:

Districts

Townhill
The district of Townhill is spread over a steep hill of the same name bordering Mayhill and visible from the Swansea city centre.  The area overlooks Swansea City Centre, the docklands and Swansea Bay.

Mayhill
The district of Mayhill is spread over the top of a steep hill just north west of the city centre.

 

Swansea electoral wards